Time of the Innocent is a 1964 West German drama film directed by Thomas Fantl.

Cast
In alphabetical order

 Karl-Otto Alberty
 Otto Brüggemann
 Hans Cossy
 Gustl Datz
 Hans Drahn
 Heinz-Leo Fischer
 Wolfgang Kieling
 Nino Korda
 Franz Mosthav
 Peter Pasetti
 Hans Reiser
 Rudolf Scarlatti
 Erik Schumann
 Walter Wilz

Production
Time of the Innocent is  based on a play by Siegfried Lenz. The film was directed by Thomas Fantl.

Release
Time of the Innocent  was distributed by Columbia-Bavaria Filmgesellschaft in Germany and represented by Export-Film Bischoff worldwide.

It was entered into the 14th Berlin International Film Festival. It opened in the presence of President Lübke and his wife, German Chancellor Erhard, Vice Chancellor Mende, Secretary of State Schröder, Minister Westrick, "Bundespressechef" von Haase in Berlin's famous Zoo Palast, which is one of the highest attendances of German politician to a Berlinale premiere.

References

External links

1964 films
1964 drama films
German drama films
West German films
1960s German-language films
Films directed by Thomas Fantl
German black-and-white films
German films based on plays
Films set in Europe
Films about war crimes
1960s German films